Flavio Ivanovic (born January 28, 1965) is an Argentine former footballer who played as a forward.

Career  
Ivanovic signed with Club Atlético Platense in the Argentine Primera División, but was loaned in 1985 to play with Club Atlético Acassuso in the Primera D Metropolitana. In 1986, he played with Club Atlético Temperley. He returned to play with Platense in 1988 where he appeared in six matches. He returned to play with Temperley in 1989 in the Primera D Metropolitana. In 1990, he played in the Primera B Nacional with Club Atlético Atlanta.

In the summer of 1990 he played abroad in the National Soccer League with Toronto Croatia, and the following season with Toronto International.

References 
 

1965 births
Living people
Argentine footballers
Club Atlético Platense footballers
Club Atlético Acassuso footballers
Club Atlético Temperley footballers
Club Atlético Atlanta footballers
Toronto Croatia players
Argentine Primera División players
Primera D Metropolitana players
Primera Nacional players
Canadian National Soccer League players
Footballers from Buenos Aires
Association football forwards
Argentine expatriate footballers
Argentine expatriate sportspeople in Canada
Expatriate soccer players in Canada